Adamjee Cantonment Public School is a school in Dhaka Cantonment, Dhaka, Bangladesh. It is managed by Bangladesh Army.

History 
Adamjee Cantonment Public School was established in 1960. At that time it followed the curriculum of British Public School and offered education in only six classes, from class four to nine. Mr. Dolman, a British educationist, was the first principle of the school. Subsequently, with further expansion of the institution, it was converted into a college and was named as Adamjee Cantonment College. In 1995 the school section was totally bifurcated and shifted to its present location and its original name "Adamjee Cantonment Public School" was reinstated.

Location and infrastructure 
The school is located in the heart of Dhaka Cantonment, on 5.00 acres of land. The school is housed in two buildings: six storied and five storied.

Academics 
At present it is a two-shift school with about 7,500 students. The Day shift which was discontinued, has been reintroduced from 2013. This school consists of Bangla and English Version.

References

Schools in Bangladesh